Calotropis procera is a species of flowering plant in the family Apocynaceae that is native to North Africa, Pakistan, tropical Africa, Western Asia, South Asia, and Indochina. The green fruits contain a toxic milky sap that is extremely bitter and turns into a gluey coating which is resistant to soap.

Common names for the plant include Apple of Sodom, Sodom apple, king's crown, rubber bush, and rubber tree. The names "Apple of Sodom and" "Dead Sea Apple" stem from the ancient authors Josephus and Tacitus, who described the plant growing in the area of biblical Sodom.

History and traditional uses

Land of Israel
Some biblical commentators believe that the Sodom apple may have been the poisonous gourd (or poison-tasting gourd) that led to "death in the pot" in the Second Book of Kings. In this story, a well-meaning servant of the prophet Elisha gathers herbs and a large quantity of the unknown gourds, and casts them into the pot. After the outcry from the band of prophets, Elisha instructs them to cast flour into the stew pot, and they are saved.

In 1938, botanists Hannah and Ephraim HaReuveni, authors of "The Squill and the Asphodal" (and parents of Noga HaReuveni), speculated that Jeremiah's ar‘ar/arow‘er was the Sodom apple.

The fibre of the Sodom apple may have been used for the linen of the high priests.

The fruit is described by the Roman Jewish historian Josephus, who saw it growing near what he calls Sodom, near the Dead Sea: "...as well as the ashes growing in their fruits; which fruits have a color as if they were fit to be eaten, but if you pluck them with your hands, they dissolve into smoke and ashes." (Whiston 1737: Book IV chapter 8 section 4)

Sodom apple is listed in the Mishnah and Talmud. The fibers attached to the seeds may have been used as wicks. However the Mishnah forbids this for the Sabbath: "It may not be lighted with cedar-bast, nor with uncombed flax, nor with floss-silk, nor with willow fiber, nor with nettle fiber. – Sabbath Chapter 2"

In his Biblical Researches in Palestine, American biblical scholar Edward Robinson describes it as the fruit of the Asclepias gigantea vel procera, a tree 10–15 feet high, with a grayish cork-like bark called 'osher by the Arabs.  He says the fruit resembled "a large, smooth apple or orange, hanging in clusters of three or four." When "pressed or struck, it explodes with a puff, like a bladder or puff-ball, leaving in the hand only the shreds of the thin rind and a few fibers. It is indeed filled chiefly with air, which gives it the round form; while in the center a small slender pod runs through it which contains a small quantity of fine silk, which the Arabs collect and twist into matches for their guns."

Bedouins of the Sinai and Negev traditionally made use of the fibers of this plant for making skull-caps (tagiyah).

West Indies: Jamaica
The plant is known to occur throughout the tropical belt and is also common in the West Indies (e.g. Jamaica), where the locals know it as "pillow cotton". When the ripe "apples" burst, the fibrous contents are ejected along with the seeds. The former are collected by the Jamaicans and used for filling pillows.

South Africa
The giant milkweed is used for fibre and medicine in Southern Africa, but it rapidly invades subsistence agricultural fields reducing yields. The plant is poisonous if eaten by livestock. It thrives in the hot northern regions of Limpopo Province. This plant is also found along road verges and in drainage lines.

Toxicity

The milky sap contains a complex mix of chemicals, some of which are steroidal heart poisons known as "cardiac aglycones". These belong to the same chemical family as similar ones found in foxgloves (Digitalis purpurea).

The plant contains steroidal components that are the cause of its toxicity. In the case of the Calotropis glycosides, their names are calotropin, calotoxin, calactin, uscharidin and voruscharin.

Literary and musical references
John Milton alludes to this plant in his epic poem, Paradise Lost, while describing the fruit that Satan and his cohorts eat after having tempted Adam and Eve to eat an apple from the Tree of the knowledge of good and evil:
...greedy they pluck'd
The Frutage fair to sight, like that which grew
Neer that bituminous Lake where Sodom flam'd;
This more delusive, not the touch, but taste
Deceav'd; they fondly thinking to allay
Thir appetite with gust, instead of Fruit
Chewd bitter Ashes, which th' offended taste
With spattering noise rejected: oft they assayd
Hunger and thirst constraining...
 (bk. 10, ll. 520–528)

Marilyn Manson recorded a song named "Apple of Sodom" for the soundtrack album of the 1997 David Lynch film Lost Highway.

References

External links
 Calotropis procera Israel Wildflowers and Native Plants
 medical uses, dangers, side effects. Caution: some websites seem to confuse Calotropis procera with Calotropis gigantea!
 
 

Asclepiadoideae
Butterfly food plants
Flora of Western Asia
Flora of North Africa
Plants described in 1811
Sodom and Gomorrah
Poisonous plants